Mowen Boino (born 16 December 1979) is a Papua New Guinean track and field athlete, who specialized in 400 metres and in 400 metres hurdles. He is a three-time Olympian and four-time national record holder for the 400 m hurdles. He also achieved his personal best time of 50.37 seconds at the 2006 Commonwealth Games in Melbourne, Australia.

Boino first competed at the 2000 Summer Olympics in Sydney, where he set a national record for Papua New Guinea in the 400 m hurdles, with a possible fastest time of 51.38 seconds. He continued to improve his athletic performance at the 2004 Summer Olympics in Athens, when he finished last in the fourth heat of the men's 400 m hurdles, by forty-one hundredths of a second ahead of his national record set from Sydney, with a time of 50.97 seconds.

At the 2008 Summer Olympics in Beijing, Boino competed again for the men's 400 m hurdles. He ran in the fourth heat, against seven other athletes, including defending champion Félix Sánchez of the Dominican Republic. Boino finished the race in sixth place by thirty-seven hundredths of a second (0.37) behind Sánchez, with a seasonal best time of 51.47 seconds.

Personal bests

International competitions

References

External links

Papua New Guinean male sprinters
Papua New Guinean male hurdlers
Living people
Olympic athletes of Papua New Guinea
Athletes (track and field) at the 2000 Summer Olympics
Athletes (track and field) at the 2004 Summer Olympics
Athletes (track and field) at the 2008 Summer Olympics
1979 births
People from the National Capital District (Papua New Guinea)
Commonwealth Games competitors for Papua New Guinea
Athletes (track and field) at the 2002 Commonwealth Games
Athletes (track and field) at the 2010 Commonwealth Games
Athletes (track and field) at the 2014 Commonwealth Games
Athletes (track and field) at the 2018 Commonwealth Games
World Athletics Championships athletes for Papua New Guinea